Arthur Povey (16 May 1886 – 13 February 1946) was an English cricketer.

Born in West Bromwich, Povey moved to Kent and appeared in five first-class matches for Kent County Cricket Club as a wicket-keeper in 1921 and 1922. However, he could not secure a place in the first-team owing to the presence of Jack Hubble, and later Les Ames. He was released after the 1924 season.

Povey committed suicide at his home in Tonbridge in 1946.

References

External links

1886 births
1946 suicides
English cricketers
Kent cricketers
Suicides in England